Yesser Roshdy (born 2 November 1986), better known by his stage name Yes-R, is a Dutch rapper and television presenter. He was born in Amsterdam, to an Egyptian father, and a Moroccan mother. Before going solo, he was part of the Dutch hip-hop formation D-Men. He has also appeared in the films 'n Beetje Verliefd and Gangsterboys.

Early career
Yes-R originates from East Amsterdam. Inspired by his cousin Ali B, he started rapping at the age of 12. A year later, he entered a talent show in which he placed second. In 2003, he was introduced to Lange Frans, the frontman of the rap formation D-Men, who was impressed by Yes-R's flow. Lange Frans then took on the production of Yes-R's recordings. The first song Chickiesflasher was an underground hit and became part of the compilation album De gastenlijst. He was also featured on the single  Sletje by Baas B as well Maritza's debut single Laat Je Gaan.

In 2004, Yes-R won the audience award of De Grote Prijs van Nederland. He also contributed to the D-Men mixtapes De Straatremixes Deel 2 and De Straatremixes Deel 3.

Solo career

Yes-R decided to leave D-Men in 2005 alongside most of its members after disagreements with the D-Men Entertainment record label, and its founding owners, namely rapper Lange Frans and rapper-singer Baas B. He signed instead to his cousin Ali B's record label. Yes-R never discussed the details of the commercial conflict with D-Men, but hinted to it in his song "Het spijt me" ("I'm sorry")

In 2005, his debut solo album Mijn pad ("My Path") was soon released where Yes-R is autobiographical telling his personal story about his life, visions and future prospects. He worked along with Soesi B as a backup vocalist and with Derenzo and DJ Kesh. He also toured throughout the Netherlands to promote his solo career. His concurrent first single with Mijn pad was released in March 2005 called "Stel je voor" featuring Baas B.

But far more notorious for chart success was the Ali B famous track "Leipe mocro flavour"  with Brace and Ali B, "mocro" meaning "person of Moroccan descent". It was released just days before the debut single. The Ali B single took him to No. 2 in Dutch Singles Chart and a No. 3 position in the Mega Top 50.

Yes-R begins has been able to target a broad audience and appears through his DVD releases. He is regularly featured not only on urban-oriented programs, but also makes an effort to take part in children shows and talk shows and has become one of the best selling rapper acts in Netherlands, winning many awards including TMF Award for "Best Newcomer" in 2006. Although Yes-R is successful on the charts, he has been suffering from stream of criticism about his commercialism by some other Dutch hip hop personalities and the Dutch people..

In June 2008, Yes-R had a chart-topping hit in Suriname entitled  "Uit Elkaar" ("Breaking Up"). It also had success in the Netherlands, reaching No. 14.

Along with rapper Akon and Ali B, he made a remix of the song "Ghetto" with additional rap verses in Dutch.

In 2009, he had a joint hit with Moroccan rapper Soesi B and Darryl.

Acting career
In 2006, Yes-R made his debut as a TV actor in the role of Omar in the film 'n Beetje Verliefd ("A Little Bit in Love") directed by Martin Koolhoven. The film had its premiere on 14 December 2006.

In 2009, Yes-R made a voiceover role in the animated film Sunshine Barry en de discowormen playing the part of Tito, a bassist in the band, in one of the leading role alongside those of Jim and Sita.

In 2009, he took the role of a Turkish rapper in the film Gangsterboys. The film was released on 18 February 2010.

In popular culture
Yes-R won the audition for a McDonald's advertising campaign thus getting more recognition with youngsters.
Yes-R has taken part in public awareness campaign for a safer Netherlands.
Alongside the Dutch television programme Baantjer character Jurriaan 'Jurre' de Cock tries to teach youngsters that they do have a choice.
He also had a hit through a joint single "Vecht mee" ("Join the Fight") with Chantal Janzen, a sensitive song about cancer.
In 2005, he appeared on many children television programs including Kinderen voor Kinderen where he performed the single "Terug naar toen" ("Back to Then").
In 2008 Yes-R presented the Nickelodeon program Hihi met Sisi
On 19 April 2008, he appeared in the Dutch game show Ik hou van Holland
On 1 March 2008 he presented the Kids Top 20 when the original presenter Monique Smit had problems in her vocal cords.
Yes-R has appeared on the Dutch television program Jensen! and many other talk shows.
After the murder of Theo van Gogh Yes-R joined Riza in being featured on Ninthe single in the song "Actueel vandaag" ("News Today"). The single was published as a non-commercial release.
In 2007 and 2008, he won Hunk of the Year award by Girlz! teen magazine and Hitkrant music. In 2009, he was also shortlisted for a second Hunk of the Year award from Hitkrant.

Awards
Music awards
2004: Grote Prijs van Nederland (Grand Orix of Netherlands Music Award)
2005: Dutch Dutch Mobo Award for Best Single for "Leipe mocro flavour" jointly with Ali B and Brace
2006: TMF Award for best Newcomer
2009: TMF Award winning TMF Pure Award
Film awards
2007: Golden Film (in Dutch Gouden Film) award for 100,000 viewers for 'n Beetje Verliefd
2010: Golden Film (Gouden Film) award for 100,000 viewers for Gangsterboys

Filmography
Feature films
2006: 'n Beetje Verliefd as Omar (English title Happy Family)
2009: Sunshine Barry en de discowormen as Tito
2010: Gangsterboys as Apo, a Turkish rapper

Discography

Albums

Mixtapes
2009: Dierentuin

Singles 

Featured in

References

External links

Yes-R page at Discogs

1986 births
Yesser Roshdy
Living people
Dutch rappers
Egyptian rappers
Dutch people of Egyptian descent
Dutch people of Moroccan descent